Joseph Sun Jigen (born August 2, 1967) is a Chinese Catholic prelate and Coadjutor bishop of the Roman Catholic Diocese of Yongnian from 2011. He was appointed bishop of the Roman catholic diocese of Yongnian on 13 October 2021.

Biography
Sun was born in Fengfeng Mining District of Handan, Hebei, on August 2, 1967. He secondary studied at the High School of Yijing Town. In September 1988 he entered the Hebei Catholic Theological and Philosophical College, where he graduated in August 1992. He was ordained a priest in 1995 by Bishop Chen Bailu. In 2007 he was appointed Coadjutor bishop of the Roman Catholic Diocese of Yongnian by the Holy See. He accepted the episcopacy with the papal mandate on June 21, 2011. On June 26, 2011, Sun was arrested by the local police and released on July 9.

References

1967 births
Living people
People from Handan
20th-century Roman Catholic bishops in China